Michael Joseph Kickham (born December 12, 1988) is an American professional baseball pitcher for the Florence Y'alls of the Frontier League. He has played in Major League Baseball (MLB) for the San Francisco Giants during 2013 and 2014, for the Boston Red Sox in 2020, and for the Los Angeles Dodgers in 2021.

Amateur career
Kickham attended Glendale High School in Springfield, Missouri, and played for the school's baseball team. His senior season as a Falcon, he posted a 1.16 ERA with 65 strikeouts. He also hit for a .390 batting average as an outfielder. Kickham earned all-conference status at both positions.

Kickham spent 2009 at Crowder College, where he went 3–3 with a 5.62 ERA. He struck out 47 batters in 41 innings. After Crowder, Kickham transferred to Missouri State University, where he was enrolled in premedical studies and studied biology. For the Missouri State Bears baseball team, Kickham had a 4–9 record with a 5.25 ERA and 103 strikeouts, in 96 innings spanning 15 games.

Professional career

San Francisco Giants
The San Francisco Giants selected Kickham in the sixth round of the 2010 MLB draft. After spending 2010 with the rookie league squad, he spent 2011 with the Augusta Greenjackets. In 2012, he was promoted to the Double-A Richmond Flying Squirrels, where he posted an 11–10 record and a 3.05 earned run average (ERA) in 28 games.

After two months with the Triple-A Fresno Grizzlies, the Giants promoted Kickham to the majors on May 26, 2013. Kickham made his debut in a start against the Oakland Athletics, pitching  innings while allowing four runs on four hits and four walks; the Giants failed to come back, and Kickham suffered the loss. With the Giants in 2013, Kickham made a total of 12 appearances (three starts), accruing an 0–3 record with 10.16 ERA and 29 strikeouts in  innings pitched. In 2014, Kickham appeared in two games for the Giants, both in relief, allowing five runs in two innings pitched for a 22.50 ERA. Overall, Kickham registered a 10.98 ERA for the Giants in a total of 14 appearances spanning  innings pitched.

Chicago Cubs
On December 23, 2014, Kickham was claimed off waivers by the Chicago Cubs. The Cubs then designated him for assignment on January 9.

Seattle Mariners
He was then traded to the Seattle Mariners on January 14, 2015, for minor league pitcher Lars Huijer. He was designated for assignment by the Mariners on May 4, 2015, when they re-added left-handed reliever Joe Beimel to the active roster.

Texas Rangers
Kickham was claimed off waivers by the Texas Rangers on May 5, 2015. Kickham was released on June 11.

Bridgeport Bluefish
Kickham signed with the Bridgeport Bluefish of the Atlantic League of Professional Baseball on July 24, 2015. He was released on July 28, 2015, without making an appearance.

San Francisco Giants (second stint)
Kickham signed a minor league contract with the San Francisco Giants in January 2016. He was released on May 30, 2016.

Kansas City T-Bones
Kickham signed with the Kansas City T-Bones of the American Association of Independent Professional Baseball on June 26, 2016.

Miami Marlins
Kickham signed a minor league contract with the Miami Marlins on March 19, 2017. He elected free agency on November 6, 2017. He re-signed a minor league deal on January 13, 2018. He elected free agency on November 2, 2018. Kickham re-signed to a minor league deal on November 16, 2018, and was invited to spring training. After spending the year in the minors, Kickham elected free agency on November 4, 2019.

Boston Red Sox
On December 20, 2019, the Boston Red Sox signed Kickham to a minor league deal and invited him to spring training. His contract was selected on August 31, 2020. He made his first appearance with the Red Sox on September 2, against the Atlanta Braves. Kickham recorded his first MLB win on September 5, when he pitched two innings of scoreless relief and the Red Sox came back to defeat the Toronto Blue Jays with two ninth-inning runs. Overall with the 2020 Red Sox, Kickham appeared in five games (two starts), compiling a 1–1 record with 8.31 ERA and 16 strikeouts in 13 innings pitched. On October 26, Kickham was outrighted off of the 40-man roster and elected free agency.

Los Angeles Dodgers
On January 8, 2021, the Los Angeles Dodgers organization signed Kickham to a minor league contract. On May 2, 2021, Kickham was selected to the 40-man roster and added to the Dodgers’ active roster. He pitched two innings for the Dodgers that night against the Milwaukee Brewers and allowed three runs on five hits. He was designated for assignment the following day. On May 5, Kickham was outrighted to Triple-A. He spent the rest of the season with the AAA Oklahoma City Dodgers, where he had a 6.51 ERA in 20 appearances. Kickham elected free agency on October 14.

Mariachis de Guadalajara
On February 15, 2022, Kickham signed with the Algodoneros de Unión Laguna of the Mexican League. However, he was released on April 15, 2022, prior to the start of the LMB season. On April 27, 2022, Kickham signed with the Mariachis de Guadalajara of the Mexican League. He made two appearances, giving up 5 earned runs in 2.1 innings pitched. Kickham was released on May 2, 2022.

Florence Y'alls
On March 13, 2023, Kickham signed with the Florence Y'alls of the Frontier League.

Scouting report

References

External links

1988 births
Living people
Sportspeople from Springfield, Missouri
Baseball players from Missouri
Major League Baseball pitchers
San Francisco Giants players
Boston Red Sox players
Los Angeles Dodgers players
Crowder Roughriders baseball players
Missouri State Bears baseball players
Arizona League Giants players
Augusta GreenJackets players
Richmond Flying Squirrels players
Fresno Grizzlies players
Tacoma Rainiers players
Round Rock Express players
Kansas City T-Bones players
Gulf Coast Marlins players
Jacksonville Jumbo Shrimp players
New Orleans Baby Cakes players
Estrellas Orientales players
American expatriate baseball players in the Dominican Republic
Naranjeros de Hermosillo players
American expatriate baseball players in Mexico
Oklahoma City Dodgers players
Mariachis de Guadalajara players